"Knockin' Boots" is the debut single by rapper Candyman and his lead single from his debut album Ain't No Shame in My Game.

Background
The song was one of the first songs produced by Johnny "J", who used samples of "Ooh Boy" by Rose Royce and "Tonight Is the Night" by Betty Wright. Rapper Tone Lōc, who had discovered Candyman, provided a spoken intro for the song and also appeared in the song's music video. Upon its release in the summer of 1990, "Knockin' Boots" became a success and quickly made it to No. 9 on the Billboard Hot 100, spending 23 weeks on the chart. The song also reached the top of the rap chart and peaked at No. 5 on the R&B chart. "Knockin' Boots" reached gold certification on October 12, 1990 for sales of over 500,000 copies, before reaching platinum status on December 18 of that year for sales of one million copies.

The success of the single also led the Ain't No Shame in My Game album to achieve gold status on the same day the single reached platinum.

Track listing
"Knockin' Boots" (Radio Mix)- 4:07  
"Knockin' Boots" (12" Mix)- 4:35  
"Knockin' Boots" (Instrumental)- 4:05  
"Knockin' Boots" (St. James Remix)- 5:10  
"Keep On Watcha Doin'"- 3:36  
"Keep On Watcha Doin'" (Instrumental)- 3:36

Charts

Weekly charts

Year-end charts

References

1990 debut singles
1990 songs
Epic Records singles
Song recordings produced by Johnny "J"
Songs written by Betty Wright
Songs written by Willie Clarke (songwriter)